The Maine Windjammers were a professional basketball team based out of Bangor, Maine, playing home games at the Bangor Auditorium. It was affiliated with the Continental Basketball Association. It existed during the CBA's 1985–86 season. After that season, the team was dropped, and it would be a decade before a basketball team would return to Maine, with the Portland Wave, a team in the USBL.

References

Defunct basketball teams in Maine
Continental Basketball Association teams
Sports in Bangor, Maine
1985 establishments in Maine
1986 disestablishments in Maine
Basketball teams in Maine
Basketball teams established in 1985
Sports clubs disestablished in 1986